The Prestaksla Nature Reserve is located on the Prestneset headland in the municipality of Molde in Møre og Romsdal county, Norway.

The area received protection in 2010 in order to protect an important forest area. The area has broadleaf deciduous forest mixed with pine forest. The broadleaf deciduous forest primarily contains hazel and some elm. On the wooded mountainside below Prestaksla there is a partially old-growth pine forest.

The reserve is located close to Bjørnstjerne Bjørnson's childhood home at the Nesset Parsonage.

References

External links
 Mijlø-direktoratet: Prestaksla. Map and description of the nature reserve.
 Miljøverndepartementet. 2009. Prestaksla naturreservat, Nesset kommune, Møre og Romsdal fylke. 1:6,000 map of the nature reserve.
 Miljøverndepartementet. 2016. Prestaksla naturreservat, Nesset kommune, Møre og Romsdal fylke. 1:10,000 map of the nature reserve.
 Forskrift om vern av Prestaksla naturreservat, Nesset kommune, Møre og Romsdal. 2010.

Nature reserves in Norway
Protected areas of Møre og Romsdal
Molde
Protected areas established in 2010